The Pelham Bay Park station is the northern terminal station of the IRT Pelham Line of the New York City Subway. Located across from Pelham Bay Park, at the intersection of the Bruckner Expressway and Westchester Avenue in the Pelham Bay neighborhood of the Bronx, it is served by the 6 train at all times, except weekdays in the peak direction, when the <6> serves it.

History 
In 1913, New York City, the Brooklyn Rapid Transit Company, and the Interborough Rapid Transit Company (IRT) reached an agreement, known as the Dual Contracts, to drastically expand subway service across New York City. As part of Contract 3 of the agreement, between New York City and the IRT, the original subway opened by the IRT in 1904 to City Hall, was to be extended north from Grand Central along Lexington Avenue into the Bronx, with a branch running northeast via 138th Street, Southern Boulevard and Westchester Avenue to Pelham Bay Park. The IRT Lexington Avenue Line opened on July 17, 1918, and the first section of the IRT Pelham Line opened to Third Avenue–138th Street on August 1, 1918.

On January 7, 1919, the Pelham Line was extended to Hunts Point Avenue. The extension was originally supposed to be finished by the end of 1918, but due to the difficulty in acquiring materials, the opening was delayed. In January 1919, the New York State Public Service Commission was acquiring property for a subway yard at Pelham Bay Park. On May 30, 1920, the Pelham Line was extended to East 177th Street. Service between Hunts Point Avenue and East 177th Street was originally served by a shuttle service operating with elevated cars. On October 24 of the same year, it was extended to Westchester Square. The line was completed to Pelham Bay Park station on December 20, which became the new terminal of the line. Service to Pelham Bay Park was served by a mix of through and shuttle trains during the 1920s.

Renovations
As part of the 1968 Program for Action, the Pelham Line would have been extended to a modern terminal nearby in the Co-op City housing complex, and the Pelham Line would have been converted to B Division standards so lettered trains could use the line. As part of the plan, this station would no longer be the line's terminal. Because of the 1975 New York City fiscal crisis, most of the remaining projects did not have funding, so they were declined. If built, the extension would have been completed by the mid-1970s or early 1980s.

In 1981, the Metropolitan Transportation Authority listed the station among the 69 most deteriorated stations in the subway system.

The station's elevators were installed in December 1989, making the station one of the earliest to comply with the Americans with Disabilities Act of 1990. The elevators were renovated from June 8, 2015 to April 2016, three months after work was expected to be completed.

Station layout

This is an elevated station which has two tracks, one island platform and two disused side platforms. The tracks end at bumper blocks at the north end of the platforms. The station was formerly set up as a Spanish solution with alighting passengers using the side platforms and boarding passengers using the island platform. Now all passengers use the island platform.

During 2005, rooms were located on the side platforms for temporary crew use while the crew quarters at the north end of the station was rebuilt. At the south end is a staff-only crossover bridge between the center and west side platform. It also used to connect to the east side platform but that portion has been removed. There is also a tower and crew facilities at the south end. There are old style signs which are covered over on the main platform.

Pelham Bay Park is the only New York City Subway terminal that does not use numerical track labels, but rather track labels based on compass directions (i.e. East track, West track). Punch boxes exist, however, at the south end of the island platform where the corresponding track numbers (Track 1 and 2) are used.

Exits
Fare control is in the mezzanine below the platforms. There are two staircases, an escalator, and an elevator that lead to Westchester Avenue. There is also a pedestrian bridge from the station entrance that crosses the Bruckner Expressway and leads to Pelham Bay Park.

The Taking of Pelham One Two Three superstition
In the novel The Taking of Pelham One Two Three by Morton Freedgood and its film adaptations (the 1974 original and the 1998 and 2009 remakes), the train that's hijacked leaves the Pelham Bay Park station at 1:23 pm, whence the callsign. After the 1974 film's release, the New York City Transit Authority banned any schedule of a train leaving this station at 1:23 am or 1:23 pm, realizing that it would become too much of a reminder to the public. Eventually this policy was rescinded, but due to the superstitions involved, dispatchers have continued to avoid scheduling a Manhattan-bound train to leave at 1:23.

Nearby points of interest 
 Pelham Bay Park
 Bartow-Pell Mansion
 Hunter Island
 Orchard Beach
 City Island
 Co-op City
 Bay Plaza Shopping Center

In the early 1960s, the Pelham Bay Park station was the closest station to the defunct Freedomland U.S.A. amusement park, now the site of Co-op City.

References

External links 

 
 Station Reporter — 6 Train
 The Subway Nut — Pelham Bay Park Pictures
 Burr Avenue entrance from Google Maps Street View
 Bruckner Boulevard entrance from Google Maps Street View
Platforms from Google Maps Street View (Daytime)
 Platforms from Google Maps Street View (Night)

IRT Pelham Line stations
New York City Subway stations in the Bronx
Railway stations in the United States opened in 1920
1920 establishments in New York City
New York City Subway terminals